The Muosuchan Range is a range of mountains in far North-eastern Russia. Administratively the range is part of the Sakha Republic, Russian Federation.

Geography 
The Muosuchan Range is one of the subranges of the Verkhoyansk Range system and is located in its southwestern section. It stretches roughly from northwest to southeast between the Bygyn Range to the west and the Tagindzhin Range to the east, running in a roughly parallel direction to both ranges. The southeastern end is bound by the valleys of the Munni (a tributary of the (Belyanka) and the Buruolakh (a tributary of the (Lyapiske), beyond which the Munni Range stretches eastwards.

River Lyapiske cuts across the range in its northwestern section and the Dyanyshka flows beyond the northern end. Lake Billyakh is located at the northwestern end of the range. Beyond it rises the Tekir Khaya (highest point ), a smaller range flanking the Dyanyshka river further to the northwest.

See also
List of mountains and hills of Russia

References

External links
Wetlands and Ramsar Convention
Verkhoyansk Range

ceb:Muosuchanskiy Khrebet
sah:Муоһучаан